The Silver Logie for Most Outstanding Comedy Program is an award presented annually at the Australian TV Week Logie Awards. The award is given to recognise an outstanding Australian comedy series. The winner and nominees of this award are chosen by television industry juries.

It was first awarded at the 9th Annual TV Week Logie Awards ceremony, held in 1967 as Best Comedy. The award was renamed many times in subsequent ceremonies; Best Australian Comedy (1968, 1972-1974), Best Comedy Show (1969), Best Comedy (1970). This award category was eliminated in 1975.

The category was reinstated as the Most Outstanding Achievement in Comedy Program in 1998 but in 1999, the category was dropped. From 2000, the award category was restored as Most Outstanding Comedy Program. In 2010, the category changed to Most Outstanding Light Entertainment Program which included comedy panel, talent and variety shows.  From 2015, the category was split into Most Outstanding Entertainment Program and a reinstated Most Outstanding Comedy Program category.  This award category was eliminated again in 2018.

Winners and nominees

Listed below are the winners of the award for each year for Best Australian Comedy.

Listed below are the winners of the award for each year for Most Outstanding Comedy Program.

From 2010 to 2014, comedy nominees were included in the Most Outstanding Light Entertainment Program category.

From 2019, comedy nominees were included in the Most Outstanding Entertainment Program category.

Multiple wins

See also
 Logie Award for Most Popular Comedy Program
 Logie Award for Most Popular Entertainment Program
 Logie Award for Most Outstanding Drama Series

References

External links

Awards established in 1967

1967 establishments in Australia